Sangara may refer to:

 Sangara (King), ruler of Carchemish
 Sangara, Pakistan, village in Khyber Pakhtunkhwa province, Pakistan.
 Sangara, Papua New Guinea, village